W, or w, is the twenty-third and fourth-to-last letter of the Latin alphabet, used in the modern English alphabet, the alphabets of other western European languages and others worldwide. It represents a consonant, but in some languages it represents a vowel. Its name in English is double-u, plural double-ues.

History

The classical Latin alphabet, from which the modern European alphabets derived, did not have the "W' character. The "W" sounds were represented by the Latin letter "V" (at the time, not yet distinct from "U").

Therefore,  no longer adequately represented the labial-velar approximant sound  of Germanic phonology.

Gothic (not Latin-based), by contrast, had simply used a letter based on the Greek Υ for the same sound in the 4th century. The digraph / was also used in Medieval Latin to represent Germanic names, including Gothic ones like Wamba.

It is from this  digraph that the modern name "double U" derives. The digraph was commonly used in the spelling of Old High German, but only in the earliest texts in Old English, where the  sound soon came to be represented by borrowing the rune , adapted as the Latin letter wynn: . In early Middle English, following the 11th-century Norman Conquest,  gained popularity again and by 1300 it had taken wynn's place in common use.

Scribal realisation of the digraph could look like a pair of Vs whose branches crossed in the middle: both forms (separate and crossed) appear for instance in the "running text" (in Latin) of the Bayeux tapestry in proper names such as EDVVARDVS, VVILLELMVS, etc. (or the same with crossed Vs). Another realisation, common in roundhand, kurrent and blackletter, takes the form of an  whose rightmost branch curved around as in a cursive  (viz. ) It was used up to the nineteenth century in Britain and continues to be familiar in Germany.

The shift from the digraph  to the distinct ligature  is thus gradual, and is only apparent in abecedaria, explicit listings of all individual letters. It was probably considered a separate letter by the 14th century in both Middle English and Middle German orthography, although it remained an outsider, not really considered part of the Latin alphabet proper, as expressed by Valentin Ickelshamer in the 16th century, who complained that:

Pronunciation and use

English
English uses  to represent . It is the fifteenth most frequently used letter in the English language, with a frequency of about 2.56% in words.

Other languages
Unlike its use in other languages, the letter is used in Welsh and Cornish to represent the vowel  as well as the related approximant consonant .

It is also used in modern systems of Romanization of Belarusian for the letter , for example in the BGN/PCGN system, in contrast to the letter , which is used in the Instruction on transliteration of Belarusian geographical names with letters of Latin script.

In Swedish and Finnish, traces of this old usage may still be found in proper names. In Hungarian remains in some aristocratic surnames, e.g. Wesselényi.

Some Bavarian dialects preserve a "light" initial , such as in wuoz (Standard German weiß  '[I] know'). The Classical Latin  is heard in the Southern German greeting Servus ('hello' or 'goodbye').

In Dutch,  became a labiodental approximant  (with the exception of words with -, which have , or other diphthongs containing -). In many Dutch-speaking areas, such as Flanders and Suriname, the  pronunciation (or in some areas a  pronunciation, e.g. Belgian-Dutch water  "water", wit  "white", eeuw  "century", etc.) is used at all times.

It is, however, recognized and maintained in the spelling of some old names, reflecting an earlier German spelling standard, and in some modern loan words. In all cases, it is pronounced . The first edition of the Kalevala had its title spelled Kalewala.

In Danish, Norwegian and Swedish,  is named double-v and not double-u. In these languages, the letter only exists in old names, loanwords and foreign words. (Foreign words are distinguished from loanwords by having a significantly lower level of integration in the language.) It is usually pronounced , but in some words of English origin it may be pronounced . The letter was officially introduced in the Danish and Swedish alphabets as late as 1980 and 2006, respectively, despite having been in use for much longer. WC being pronounced as VC, www as VVV, WHO as VHO, etc.) The two letters were sorted as equals before  was officially recognized, and that practice is still recommended when sorting names in Sweden. In modern slang, some native speakers may pronounce  more closely to the origin of the loanword than the official  pronunciation.

Multiple dialects of Swedish and Danish use the sound however. In Denmark notably in Jutland, where the northern half use it extensively in traditional dialect, and multiple places in Sweden. It is used in southern Swedish, for example in Halland where the words "wesp" (wisp) and "wann" (water) are traditionally used. Elfdalian is a good example, which is one of many dialects where the Old Norse difference between v and f ( or ) is preserved. Thus "warg" from Old Norse "vargr", but "åvå" from Old Norse "hafa".

In the alphabets of most modern Romance languages,  is used mostly in foreign names and words recently borrowed (Italian il watt, Spanish el kiwi). In Italian, while the letter  is not considered part of the standard Italian alphabet, the character is often used in place of Viva (hooray for...), generally in the form in which the branches of the Vs cross in the middle, at least in handwriting (in fact it could be considered a monogram). The same symbol written upside down indicates abbasso (down with...). In French,  is also used mostly in foreign names and words recently borrowed such as wagon or week-end, but in the first case it is pronounced  (except in Picard and in Walloon) and in the second . Walloon as it sounds conserves the  pronounced . The digraph  is used to render  in rare French words such as ouest "west" and to spell Arabic names transliterated -wi in English, but -oui in French (compare Arabic surname Badawi / Badaoui). In all these languages, as in Scandinavian languages mentioned above, the letter is named "double v" (French , Spanish ) though in Walloon and Picard the name  is also used.

In Indonesian, the letter "W" is called 'wé'. The letter names in Indonesian are always the same with the sounds they produce, especially the consonants.

The Japanese language uses "W", pronounced /daburu/, as an ideogram meaning "double". It is also used in internet slang to indicate laughter (like LOL), derived from the word warau (笑う, meaning "to laugh").

In Italian, while the letter  is not considered part of the standard Italian alphabet, the character is often used in place of Viva (hooray for...), generally in the form in which the branches of the Vs cross in the middle, at least in handwriting (in fact it could be considered a monogram). The same symbol written upside down indicates abbasso (down with...)

In the Kokborok language,  represents the open-mid back rounded vowel .

In Turkey the use of the w was banned between 1928 and 2013 which was a problem for the Kurdish population in Turkey as the w was a letter of the Kurdish alphabet. The use of the letter w in the word Newroz, the Kurdish new year was forbidden and names which included the letter were not able to be used. In 2008, a court in Gaziantep reasoned the use of the letter w would incite civil unrest. Nevertheless, the w was used in water closets throughout Turkey.

In Vietnamese,  is called , from the French . It is not included in the standard Vietnamese alphabet, but it is often used as a substitute for qu- in literary dialect and very informal writing. It's also commonly used for abbreviating Ư in formal documents, for example Trung Ương is abbreviated as TW even in official documents and document ID number

"W" is the 24th letter in the Modern Filipino Alphabet and has its English name. However, in the old Filipino alphabet, Abakada, it was the 19th letter and had the name "wah".

In Washo, lower-case  represents a typical  sound, while upper-case  represents a voiceless w sound, like the difference between English weather and whether for those who maintain the distinction.

Other systems
In the International Phonetic Alphabet,  is used for the voiced labial-velar approximant.

Other uses

W is the symbol for the chemical element tungsten, after its German (and alternative English) name, . It is also the SI symbol for the watt, the standard unit of power. It is also often used as a variable in mathematics, especially to represent a complex number or a vector.

In recent years, the letters L and W have become an internet meme, respectively standing for loss and win.

Name 
Double-u, whose name reflects stages in the letter's evolution when it was considered two of the same letter, a double U, is the only modern English letter whose name has more than one syllable. It is also the only English letter whose name is not pronounced with any of the sounds that the letter typically makes in words, with the exception of H for some speakers.

Some speakers shorten the name "double u" into "dub-u" or just "dub"; for example, University of Wisconsin, University of Washington, University of Wyoming, University of Waterloo, University of the Western Cape and University of Western Australia are all known colloquially as "U Dub", and the automobile company Volkswagen, abbreviated "VW", is sometimes pronounced "V-Dub". The fact that many website URLs require a "www." prefix has been influential in promoting these shortened pronunciations.

In other Germanic languages, including German (but not Dutch, in which it is pronounced wé), its name is similar to that of English V. In many languages, its name literally means "double v": Portuguese duplo vê, Spanish doble ve (though it can be spelled uve doble), French double vé, Icelandic tvöfalt vaff, Czech dvojité vé, Estonian kaksisvee, Finnish kaksois-vee, etc.

Former U.S. president George W. Bush was given the nickname "Dubya" after the colloquial pronunciation of his middle initial in Texas, where he spent much of his childhood.

Related characters

Ancestors, descendants and siblings
𐤅: Semitic letter Waw, from which the following symbols originally derive
U : Latin letter U
V : Latin letter V
Ⱳ ⱳ : W with hook
Ꝡ ꝡ : Latin letter VY
Ꟃ ꟃ : Anglicana W, used in medieval English and Cornish
IPA-specific symbols related to W:    
Uralic Phonetic Alphabet-specific symbols related to W:  and 
ʷ : Modifier letter small w is used in Indo-European studies
ꭩ : Modifier letter small turned w is used in linguistic transcriptions of Scots
W with diacritics: Ẃ ẃ Ẁ ẁ Ŵ ŵ Ẅ ẅ Ẇ ẇ Ẉ ẉ ẘ
װ (double vav): the Yiddish and Hebrew equivalent of W
Arabic و, has the same origin despite bearing little resemblance to W

Ligatures and abbreviations
₩ : Won sign, capital letter W with double stroke

Computing codes

 1

Other representations

See also
 Digamma (Ϝ), the archaic Greek letter for /w/
Voiced labio-velar approximant
Wh (digraph)
 W stands for Work in physics
 W is the symbol for "watt" in the International System of Units (SI)

References
Informational notes

Citations

External links

ISO basic Latin letters
Latin-script ligatures
Vowel letters